Bathymunida corniculata is a species of squat lobster in the family Munididae found in French Polynesia.

References

Squat lobsters
Crustaceans described in 2013